The Transmitter Nuremberg-Kleinreuth was a broadcasting facility for medium wave at Nuremberg, Bavaria, Germany.  It was founded in 1927 in Nuremberg-Kleinreuth at the former Broadcast Street 24, now Sigmund Street 181, in order to supply the northern areas of Bavaria with broadcast programs in the medium-wave band.

Antenna
Between 1927 and 1935 this plant's transmission antenna was a T-antenna, which was spun between two  freestanding steel framework towers.

In 1935 this antenna was replaced by a  tower  built of wood, which became available at the change of the antenna system at transmitter Ismaning in 1934 and which was rebuilt in Nuremberg-Kleinreuth after its disassembly.

On 6 April 1950 a  guyed mast radiator went into service at Nuremberg-Kleinreuth. The now dispensable wood tower was demolished on 12 July 1961 because of decay.

Closure
On 15 September 1969 the  Nuremberg-Kleinreuth broadcasting station was shut down, after the radio mast at Dillberg had been equipped with a cage aerial for medium wave transmission and thus could overtake the function of the transmitter  Nuremberg-Kleinreuth.
In 1973 the area of the transmitting plant was sold to the company Theisen KG, which allowed the remaining installations of the abandoned transmitter be demolished in order to build a factory hall there.

See also
List of towers

References

Former radio masts and towers
Radio masts and towers in Germany
1927 establishments in Germany
1969 disestablishments in West Germany